Kolus Forush (also Romanized as Kolūs Forūsh, Kaloos Foroosh, Kolash Forūsh, and Kolosforūsh; also known as Kholūşforūz, Kulusferoz, and Kulusferush) is a village in Dasht-e Veyl Rural District, Rahmatabad and Blukat District, Rudbar County, Gilan Province, Iran. At the 2006 census, its population was 41, in 10 families.

References 

Populated places in Rudbar County